Kang Song-Ho (born May 28, 1987, in Tokyo, Japan) is a Japanese-born North Korean midfielder.

Club statistics

References

External links

1987 births
Living people
North Korean footballers
North Korean expatriate sportspeople in Japan
North Korean expatriate footballers
Association football people from Tokyo
Expatriate footballers in Japan
J1 League players
J2 League players
J3 League players
Oita Trinita players
Shimizu S-Pulse players
Kyoto Sanga FC players
Tokyo Verdy players
Zweigen Kanazawa players
Zainichi Korean people
Association football midfielders